The  are the rest areas along the Tōkaidō, which was a coastal route that ran from Nihonbashi in Edo (modern-day Tokyo) to Sanjō Ōhashi in Kyoto.  There were originally 53 government post stations along the Tōkaidō, where travelers had to present traveling permits at each station if wanting to cross.

In 1619, the Ōsaka Kaidō (大阪街道) was developed to extend the Tōkaidō so that it would reach Kōraibashi in modern-day Osaka. Instead of going to Sanjō Ōhashi, travelers would leave from Ōtsu-juku and travel towards Fushimi-juku. Because of the addition of these four post towns, the Tōkaidō is occasionally referred to as having 57 stations. Another name for this extension was Kyōkaidō (京街道).

The inland Nakasendō also started at Nihonbashi, and converged with the Tōkaidō at Kusatsu-juku. Shio no Michi intersected with the Tōkaidō at Okazaki-shuku.

Stations of the Tōkaidō

See also
 Edo Five Routes
 69 Stations of the Nakasendō
 44 Stations of the Kōshū Kaidō
 27 Stations of the Ōshū Kaidō
 21 Stations of the Nikkō Kaidō
 Other Routes
 17 Stations of the Hokkoku Kaidō
 11 Stations of the Kisoji

Notes

References

External links 
 53 Stations of the Tōkaidō Google Map

 
Japan transport-related lists
Tourist attractions in Tokyo
Tourist attractions in Kanagawa Prefecture
Tourist attractions in Shizuoka Prefecture
Tourist attractions in Aichi Prefecture
Tourist attractions in Mie Prefecture
Tourist attractions in Shiga Prefecture
Tourist attractions in Kyoto Prefecture
Tourist attractions in Osaka Prefecture
Lists of tourist attractions in Japan